.med is a top-level domain for the internet, launched on 3 December 2015, intended for websites related to medicine.

Google and the Cleveland Clinic both submitted applications to control this top-level domain, but both were rejected after objections by the International Chamber of Commerce in 2014. The decision against Cleveland Clinic's application was reversed later that same year.

In 2015, the application of Medistry LLC, a subsidiary of Second Generation Ltd, was accepted.

Other Uses

.med is also a filename extension linked to the Salome platform, a numerical simulation tool.

See also
 Proposed top-level domain
 List of Internet top-level domains

References

External links
Registry website

Generic top-level domains